Diacopene or Diakopene was a district in the west of ancient Pontus, described by Strabo, after the plain Chiliocomon near Amasia. It was given its name by the town Diacopa located within the district.

References

Geography of Pontus